Emmett Township is the name of some places in the U.S. state of Michigan:

 Emmett Charter Township, Michigan in Calhoun County
 Emmett Township, St. Clair County, Michigan

See also
 Emmett, Michigan
 Emmet County, Michigan
 Emmet Township (disambiguation)

Michigan township disambiguation pages